Justin Wayne Tubb (August 20, 1935 – January 24, 1998) was an American country music singer and songwriter. Born in San Antonio, Texas, United States, he was the oldest son of country singer Ernest Tubb, known for popular songs like "Walking the Floor Over You".

Biography
By 1954, Tubb made it on the country chart with two duets with Goldie Hill—("Looking Back to See" and "Sure Fire Kisses"). A year later, at age 20, he was made a member of the Grand Ole Opry. Tubb had a few recordings of his own that enjoyed success, including "I Gotta Go Get My Baby" and "Take a Letter Miss Gray", but he was more successful as a songwriter. He penned many hit songs for other performers, including "Keeping Up with the Joneses", "Love Is No Excuse", and "Lonesome 7-7203", a hit for Hawkshaw Hawkins. Ultimately, six of his songs won awards. In the late 1950s he roomed with a young, up-and-coming songwriter named Roger Miller.

During the 1960s, Tubb worked with his father on various business projects. Toward the end of his own life, he completed an album of duets with his father, using recordings Ernest had made before his death. The album, Just You and Me Daddy (1999), was released after Justin Tubb died in Nashville on January 24, 1998. He was survived by his wife, Carolyn McPherson Tubb.

Both of his sons (two of Ernest's grandsons)—Cary Tubb (died November 27, 2008, survived by older son Bryce and younger son Codee) and his younger brother Zachary Tubb—became musicians. Cary performed around the U.S. and in England. Zachary has released one album. Justin's cousin Glenn Douglas Tubb, born the same year as Justin but outliving him by 23 years, was also a prominent Nashville songwriter.

Singles

Albums
Country Boy in Love (1957)
Star of the Grand Ole Opry (1962)
The Modern Country Western Sound of Justin Tubb (1963)
Where You're Concerned (1965)
Justin Tubb & Lorene Mann (1966)
That Country Style (1967)
Things I Still Remember Very Well (1969)
A New Country Heard From (1974)
Justin Tubb (1981)
Justin Tubb (1985)
Just You and Me Daddy (1999)

Notes

References

External links

 

1935 births
1998 deaths
People from San Antonio
American country singer-songwriters
Grand Ole Opry members
Starday Records artists
Challenge Records artists
Groove Records artists
20th-century American singers
Country musicians from Texas
Singer-songwriters from Texas